The Two Mrs. Carrolls is a 1947 American mystery film directed by Peter Godfrey and starring Humphrey Bogart, Barbara Stanwyck, and Alexis Smith. It was produced by Mark Hellinger from a screenplay by Thomas Job, based on the 1935 play by Martin Vale.

Plot
While on vacation in Scotland, Sally Morton learns that her lover of only two weeks, the painter Geoffrey Carroll, is married to an invalid and ends their romance. Before returning home to his pre-teen daughter, Beatrice, and his ill wife, Geoffrey buys a package from chemist Horace Blagdon, giving a false name when he signs the register. Geoffrey is painting his wife's portrait, depicting her as an "angel of death."

Two years pass and Geoffrey's first wife has died, leaving him free to marry Sally. They settle into her mansion (inherited from her father). Although Geoffrey's career is doing well, lately he has been unable to paint anything of quality. Sally, the new Mrs. Carroll, entertains her old boyfriend, Charles "Penny" Pennington, and some wealthy American guestswho include the icy but beautiful Cecily Latham. Geoffrey begins painting Cecily's portrait and becomes romantically involved with her. Sally begins to suspect her husband's illicit romance.
Several weeks pass and Sally has fallen ill, recovered, and become ill again. The bumbling, alcoholic local physician, Dr. Tuttle, believes that she is recovering from what he misdiagnoses as "a case of nerves."

Geoffrey goes out to call Horace, who has made a demand for money. As Beatrice packs to begin her journey to a boarding school, Sally leaves bed, surprised to discover that Beatrice is leaving. Beatrice reveals to Sally that the "first Mrs. Carroll" was not an invalid, but began to suffer from a series of illnesses very similar to her own immediately after Sally's trip to Scotland.
Sally suspects that Geoffrey is gradually poisoning her via her nightly glasses of warm milk. Under the ruse of traveling to London regarding a potentially lucrative commission, Geoffrey visits Horace to make a blackmail payment but ends up beating the chemist to death. Meanwhile, Beatrice implores Sally to open the art studio so she can see Geoffrey's new portrait of Sally before she leaves for school. Sally is shocked to discover that the portrait depicts her as deathlike.

That night, during a terrific rainstorm, Sally disposes of her nightly glass of milk, rather than drinking it, and retires to her bedroom. She calls Penny and asks him to come at once, just before Geoffrey, having discovered the spilt milk by the window, cuts the telephone connection from downstairs. Inspired by a newspaper article about a local burglar who may be strangling his victims, Geoffrey ransacks the living room before going outside into the rain and breaking into his wife's bedroom. He confesses that he murdered his previous wife and tells Sally that because she no longer inspires his work, she must be killed so he can move on to another person for inspiration. Geoffrey chokes Sally into unconsciousness and the police and Penny arrive. Penny rushes to Sally, helping revive her. As the officers escort Geoffrey outside, he offers to get them a drinknamely a glass of milk.

Cast

 Humphrey Bogart as Geoffrey Carroll
 Barbara Stanwyck as Sally Morton Carroll
 Alexis Smith as Cecily Latham
 Nigel Bruce as Dr. Tuttle
 Isobel Elsom as Mrs. Latham
 Patrick O'Moore as Charles Pennington (Penny)
 Ann Carter as Beatrice Carroll
 Anita Sharp-Bolster as Christine
 Barry Bernard as Horace Blagdon
 Colin Campbell as MacGregor
 Peter Godfrey as Racetrack Tout

Production
"Martin Vale" was the pseudonym of Marguerite Vale Veiller, the wife of writer Bayard Veiller. Her play, The Two Mrs. Carrolls, opened in London in 1935. The play (now rewritten) moved to Broadway in 1943, where it was a minor hit.

Actress Elisabeth Bergner won high praise for the role of Sally Morton Carroll. During the play's run, a shy girl showed up at the stage door night after night to speak with Bergner. Bergner eventually became a mentor to the girl, sponsored her career in the theater, and won her a role as an understudy in The Two Mrs. Carrolls. The girl eventually undercut Bergner's career. The incident became the basis for the short story "The Wisdom of Eve" (1946) by Mary Orr, which was adapted for the movie All About Eve (1950).

In the summer of 1944, Warner Brothers paid $225,000 for the film rights to the play. Although no screenwriter had been assigned to adapt the play for film, Warners announced that Bette Davis would star in the Sally Carroll role and Jesse L. Lasky would produce. Meanwhile, Warners also purchased the rights to the Ayn Rand novel, The Fountainhead. The studio hired Mervyn LeRoy to direct, and announced that Humphrey Bogart and Barbara Stanwyck would star in it.

Veiller and Vale's play was significantly altered for the film. In the play, the first Mrs. Carroll is not murdered in the first act but rather lives (off-stage) until the third act. She telephones Sally to warn her that Geoffrey is attempting to poison her. This provides a major shock to the audience, which had no reason to suspect Geoffrey. In the screenplay, the first Mrs. Carroll dies (off-screen) minutes into the film. Suspense replaces shock, as Sally slowly begins to suspect her husband of murder. William Faulkner worked on an early treatment of the play.

Some time in the latter half of 1944, Warners announced that Ida Lupino and Zachary Scott would star in The Two Mrs. Carrolls. On November 12, however, the studio said Barbara Stanwyck would star alongside Paul Henreid, and that Robert Buckner would produce the film. Then on February 9, 1945, the studio announced that it was placing its production of The Fountainhead on hold due to the high cost and unavailability of materials to construct the large architectural sets for the film. The studio also announced it had recast The Two Mrs. Carrolls with Humphrey Bogart and Barbara Stanwyck.

According to Stanwyck biographer Axel Madsen, Stanwyck agreed to do the film out of boredom. Stanwyck's husband, Robert Taylor, was serving in the U.S. military in World War II. Although the war in Europe was clearly ending, Stanwyck knew Taylor would not return to the United States for many months. However, another reason Stanwyck agreed to do the film is that she was close friends with director Peter Godfrey. They met while Stanwyck starred in the Christmas comedy Christmas in Connecticut in 1945, which Godfrey directed. Stanwyck became close friends with Godfrey and his wife.

The Two Mrs. Carrolls was Stanwyck's second film with Godfrey, Stanwyck biographer Dan Callahan has argued that Stanwyck's friendship with Godfrey blinded her to his shortcomings as a director, which were significant. Film historian Edmund Bansak notes that The Two Mrs. Carrolls was written as a vehicle for Stanwyck, which may also explain her willingness to star in the picture. Bogart biographer Richard Gehman challenges this claim. He says the rights to the play were purchased so that Bogart could star in the film adaptation.

Although the studio assigned a B movie director and producer, it hired A-list stars and the film had an A-list budget. Filming began in April 1945, and ended in June. Filming was almost all on sets at the Warner Bros. studio. Warners' veteran set designer, Anton Grot, designed the interiors of the Carroll mansion in England. Painter John Decker produced the two portraits used in the film. Humphrey Bogart wed Lauren Bacall on May 21, 1945 during the production. There was a brief hiatus in the production to accommodate their honeymoon.

Bogart and Stanwyck had a friendly relationship on set. Producer Mark Hellinger, whom Bogart liked very much, announced that Bogart would not be seen in any painter's wardrobe which would appear unmasculine. When a painter's smock and beret with a tassel showed up on his wardrobe clothes rack one day, the actor was furious. The smock and beret were a joke perpetrated by Stanwyck, and the two performers had a good laugh afterward.

Warner Bros. did not immediately release The Two Mrs. Carrolls. Rationales vary widely for the delay. Turner Classic Movies reviewer Jeremy Arnold concludes that this was because the film had a strong similarity to the 1944 film Gaslight. But film historian Richard Schickel says that it was because Warners hoped that Bogart's rising popularity as a Hollywood star would help overcome his awful performance in The Two Mrs. Carrolls. The studio was also unhappy that, in 1946, the song "Open the Door, Richard" had become a popular song, with five versions released in 1946 and 1947. The studio considered cutting or refilming the scene in which Bogart pounds on Stanwyck's bedroom door, demanding that she open it. But the scene stayed.

The Two Mrs. Carrolls was finally released in the United States on March 4, 1947. The studio had a relatively poor marketing campaign for the picture. Theater owners were asked to promote the film by holding contests in which female patrons were to decide whether they looked more like female lead Barbara Stanwyck or Alexis Smith.

Box office
The Two Mrs. Carrolls did poorly at the box office. According to Warner Bros. records, the film earned $2,292,000 in the U.S. and $1,277 in other markets.

Critical reception

The film received generally poor reviews in the United States upon its release. Reviewers in the British press found the film's "quaint old English" atmosphere over the top and amusing.

Modern reviewers tend to be highly critical of the film, but some find redeeming elements in it. Stanwyck biographer Dan Callahan, writing in 2012, called the film a "dreadful adaptation of a derivative stage thriller" and far too similar to Alfred Hitchcock's Suspicion (1941). He found that Peter Godfrey's direction exhibited "a whole new level of miscalculation and incompetence", and had a very low opinion of the acting. Stanwyck, he concluded, was incongruously chipper early in the film, while giving a stilted, distracted performance in the second half. Bogart was "embarrassing" with his over-acted insanity, Nigel Bruce turned in a similarly hammy performance, and Ann Carter's adult-sounding dialogue was delivered with "lugubrious" slowness. Stanwyck biographer Axel Madsen's 2001 assessment of the film was similarly poor. He believed that Godfrey indulged Bogart as a director, "letting [him] mug outrageously". He thought both Bogart and Stanwyck were miscast and felt the script undermined any suspense in the plot by repeatedly alluding to Bogart's madness. Film reviewer Barry Monush felt the script gave Alexis Smith so little to do that casting her hardly seemed worth it. Film biographer David Quinlan, writing in 1983, concluded that the film's fundamental flaws extended from Godfrey's shortcomings as a director and the miscasting of Bogart as an insane wife-killer.

Some reviews of the film are more mixed. Madsen, for example, states the one well-written and well-acted scene in the film occurs when Stanwyck breaks into Bogart's studio and sees his demonic painting of her. Film historian Daniel Bubbeo, while unhappy with the film's similarities to Gaslight and Suspicion, praises the scene in which Bogart, in terrifying makeup, crashes through a window to attack Stanwyck. Similarities to other, better films are noticeable in The Two Mrs. Carrolls. At least one observer has pointed out that the scene in which Bogart climbs a set of stairs to bring Stanwyck a glass of poisoned milk is almost identical to a scene in Suspicion. Sociologist Steve Zimmerman also notes the film's many shortcomings, but also says the picture "manages to hold one's attention". Turner Classic Movies reviewer Jeremy Arnold was much more positive about the film, noting that its visuals were quite effective in creating an "impressive Gothic atmosphere. Godfrey uses mysterious lighting, images of blowing curtains and haunting paintings, and sounds of creaking boards, closing doors, and church bells to build suspense and a creepy atmosphere." Film historian Edmund Bansak, while acknowledging that Bogart and Stanwyck were miscast, found that Stanwyck stole the show with her performance. He also thought the film well-produced, the musical score by Franz Waxman highly effective, and Stanwyck's discovery of the "angel of death" painting scene very good.

Themes

Painting, portraiture, and art play major roles in The Two Mrs. Carrolls. Many scholars have noted the similarity between Edgar Allan Poe's short story "The Oval Portrait" and this film. In Poe's story, a man obsessively paints his wife's realistic portrait for weeks only to discover that she has died during the process and her spirit now inhabits the painting. Similarly, Geoffrey Carroll begins obsessively painting his wives as "angels of death" before killing them. The Two Mrs. Carrolls is also one of several murder/mystery films and film noirs—such as A Double Life (1947), Experiment Perilous (1943), Gaslight (1944), Laura (1944), The Paradine Case (1947), The Picture of Dorian Gray (1945), Rebecca (1940), Scarlet Street (1945), A Woman's Vengeance (1947)—made in the 1940s in which a portrait (usually of a woman) plays a major role, by obsessing a character, by depicting a clue to a mystery, by summoning up bad memories, by acting as a catalyst for action, or through some other means.

More specifically, The Two Mrs. Carrolls positions the image of a woman as emasculating. The film depicts Geoffrey Carroll as being able to paint only when engaged in immoral behavior, such as adultery or murder. A happy relationship with a healthy, active woman is debilitating, and he turns toward adultery to solve his problem. The more powerful his paintings of women become, the more he sinks into madness (and murder). Film theorist Helen Hanson points out that any image of a strong, happy woman not only undercuts Carroll's artistic abilities but also drives him insane. A corollary theme running through the film is the idea of art as demasculinizing. Film historian Philip Hayward observes that the picture goes to excessive lengths to denigrate art and artists. Christine, the Carrolls' housekeeper, judgmentally sneers, "When you work for an artist, you can expect just about anything." A rich visitor to the Carroll mansion denigrates Geoffrey's art by caustically declaring "The man is an art critic — the women are normal people." In its publicity campaign for the picture, Warner Bros. played up Bogart's masculine screen image in order to counter any idea that his role might be effeminate.

Paranoia is another theme running through the film. Although Sally Morton knows that Geoffrey Carroll is a liar (she learns in the film's opening minutes that he has lied about his marital status), she nevertheless agrees to marry him. She does not begin to suspect that her husband may be poisoning her until she overhears a group of friends discussing the suspicious death of the first Mrs. Carroll. Sally's paranoia becomes the dominant theme of the last half of the film. In this regard, film scholar Mary Ann Doane points out, The Two Mrs. Carrolls is one of many "paranoid women's films" which were common in the 1940s. These include Caught (1949), Dragonwyck (1946), Experiment Perilous (1944), Gaslight (1944), Jane Eyre (1943), The Locket (1946), Secret Beyond the Door (1948), and The Spiral Staircase (1946). These films, Doane argues, are evocative of an era in which men felt their roles as breadwinners and as workers in industry being supplanted by women due to the need for war industry workers.

A final theme evident in The Two Mrs. Carrolls is that of the Bluebeard legend. A French folk tale, the Bluebeard legends tells the tale of a hideously ugly man who has married many times. Each of his wives has mysteriously disappeared. His pretty young new bride discovers that he has murdered his previous spouses. When Bluebeard attempts to kill her after her discovery, she is saved by the intervention of relatives. The Two Mrs. Carrolls clearly evokes the Bluebeard legend, film scholars note.

Shown on the Turner Classic Movies show 'Noir Alley' with Eddie Muller on January 21, 2023.

References

Bibliography
 Bansak, Edmund G. Fearing the Dark: The Val Lewton Career. Jefferson, N.C.: McFarland, 1995.
 Belton, John. Movies and Mass Culture. New Brunswick, N.J.: Rutgers Univ. Press, 1996.
 Bubbeo, Daniel. The Women of Warner Brothers: The Lives and Careers of 15 Leading Ladies, With Filmographies for Each. Jefferson, N.C.: McFarland, 2002.
 Callahan, Dan. Barbara Stanwyck: The Miracle Woman. Jackson, Miss.: University Press of Mississippi, 2012.
 Chandler, Charlotte. The Girl Who Walked Home Alone: Bette Davis, A Personal Biography. New York: Applause Theatre & Cinema Books, 2007.
 Cohan, Steven. Masked Men: Masculinity and the Movies in the Fifties. Bloomington, Ind.: Indiana University Press, 1997.
 Doane, Mary Ann. The Desire to Desire: The Woman's Film of the 1940s. Bloomington, Ind.: Indiana University Press, 1987.
 Felleman, Susan. Art in the Cinematic Imagination. Austin, Tex.: University of Texas Press, 2006.
 Gehman, Richard. Bogart: An Intimate Biography. Greenwich, Conn.: Fawcett Publications, 1965.
 Hanson, Helen. Hollywood Heroines: Women in Film Noir and the Female Gothic Film. New York: Palgrave Macmillan, 2007.
 Hayward, Philip. Picture This: Media Representations of Visual Art and Artists. Luton, U.K.: University of Luton Press, 1998.
 Hermansson, Casie. Bluebeard: A Reader's Guide to the English Tradition. Jackson, Miss.: University Press of Mississippi, 2009.
 Hischak, Thomas S. and Bordman, Gerald Martin. The Oxford Companion to American Theatre. Oxford: Oxford University Press, 2006.
 Jordan, Stephen C. Bohemian Rogue: The Life of Hollywood Artist John Decker. Lanham, Md.: Scarecrow Press, 2005.
 Madsen, Axel. Stanwyck. San Jose, Calif.: iUniverse.com, 2001.
 Meyers, Jeffrey. Bogart: A Life in Hollywood. New York: Fromm International, 1999.
 Monush, Barry. Screen World Presents the Encyclopedia of Hollywood Film Actors. New York: Applause Theatre and Cinema Books, 2003.
 Nollen, Scott Allen. Warners Wiseguys: All 112 Films That Robinson, Cagney and Bogart Made for the Studio. Jefferson, N.C.: McFarland & Co., 2008.
 Quinlan, David. The Illustrated Guide to Film Directors. Totowa, N.J.: Barnes & Noble, 1983.
 Robards, Brooks. Excursions into the Biopic, Mystery/Suspense, Melodrama and Movies of the Eighties." In Beyond the Stars. Vol. 3: The Material World in American Popular Film. Paul Loukides and Linda K. Fuller, eds.  Bowling Green, Ohio: Bowling Green State University Popular Press, 1993.
 Schickel, Richard. Bogie: A Celebration of the Life and Films of Humphrey Bogart. New York: Thomas Dunne Books, 2007.
 Spicer, Andrew. Historical Dictionary of Film Noir. Lanham, Md.: Scarecrow Press, 2010.
 Zimmerman, Steve. Food in the Movies. Jefferson, N.C.: McFarland, 2009.

External links
 
 
 
 
 

1947 films
1947 crime drama films
1940s thriller films
American black-and-white films
American crime drama films
American thriller films
Film noir
Films scored by Franz Waxman
American films based on plays
Films directed by Peter Godfrey
Films set in England
Films set in Scotland
Films set in London
Films set in country houses
American mystery films
1947 mystery films
Films about fictional painters
Adultery in films
Uxoricide in fiction
Warner Bros. films
1940s English-language films
1940s American films